Johanna Rytkölä (née Johanna Näsänen; born 1956) is a Finnish sculptor who works in stoneware ceramics. She studied at the University of Art and Design in Helsinki, Finland, receiving a Master of Arts degree in the Department of Art Education in 1982, and in 1986, a Master of Arts degree in the Department of Ceramics and Glass Design. The University of Art and Design became part of the Aalto University in 2010. She received the state artist grant for a five-year period in 2008 and for one year in 2015. She lives and works in the city of Vantaa in her studio house renovated from a former grocery store building.

Johanna Rytkölä had her first solo exhibitions in 1988 in Galleria Bronda in Helsinki, Finland, and in the gallery Blås & Knåda in Stockholm, Sweden. She has since held numerous solo exhibitions and presented her works in joint and group exhibitions in Finland and abroad, for example in Germany, Italy, Austria, France, Spain, Japan, Korea, Taiwan, China, Canada, USA, Norway, Denmark, Ireland, Croatia, Turkey, Hungary, Romania, and Russia.

She has recently had solo exhibitions in Finland for example in the Heinola Art Museum in 2016 and in Gallery Bronda, Helsinki, in 2014. In 2018, Johanna Rytkölä's works were shown in Finland for example in the international ”About Clay” exhibition, and abroad in the IAC members’ exhibition in Taiwan and in the 40 year anniversary exhibition of Gallery Heller in Germany.

Works 

Johanna Rytkölä combines sculpture and ceramic art to create unique artworks. Her sculptures made of stoneware ceramics are characterized by clear forms and bright colors and an interplay of matt and shiny surfaces. According to Jennifer Hawkins Opie, Rytkölä has ”an especially acute sense of color and an ability to create and control colors in her work.”

While the works are often impressive in size, their curving planes, characteristic of Rytkölä's style, give an impression of bold movement, associating with dance, music, or streaming water. The curved shapes of her works have been described, on the one hand, geometric or architectural or, on the other, organic or biomoprhic. Nevertheless, her works have also been considered “surreal” and not constricted by form.

Åsa Hellman writes in the book Taidekeramiikka Suomessa [Ceramic art in Finland]:

"Johanna Rytkölä's works immediately drew attention when she started to participate in exhibitions in the 1980s. The public was used to associating sculpture with stone, bronze, plaster or wood. While clay sculptures had for long been made by Finnish ceramicists they had often had a more industrial design and decorative flavor. Johanna Rytkölä presented completely abstract artworks, closer to traditional sculpture in form and expression but still based on mastery of ceramic techniques."

With her mastery of the techniques of ceramics, Rytkölä has been seen to continue the tradition of Finnish ceramic art but also to stand out due to her stance associated with sculpture. She has been considered an innovator both as a sculptor and as a ceramic artist.

Works in collections and in the urban environment 
Several works by Johanna Rytkölä are held in the Art Collection of the Finnish State. A number of art collections in Finland, both public (e.g. Salo Art Museum) and private (e.g. The Paulo Foundation) have acquired her ceramic sculptures, as well as art and design museums (e.g. Röhsska Museum in Göteborg, Sweden) and collections of ceramic art in other countries (e.g. FuLe International Ceramic Art Museums, in Fuping, China, and Sanbao Ceramic Art Institute, in Jingedezhen, China).

The 14 meter long "Wall of Joy" was designed by Johanna Rytkölä for the square of the police headquarters in the city of Tampere in 1993. The colorful ceramic mural is composed of factory made clinker tiles.

In 2005, a 12 meter long wall-like ceramic sculpture was created jointly by three Finnish artists: Päivi Kiuru, Maarit Mäkelä and Johanna Rytkölä. The work is built along a walkway in the residential area Arabianranta in Helsinki. The building blocks of the ceramic wall carry serigraph printed pictures of the Arabia porcelain factory formerly located in the area.

In 2018, Johanna Rytkölä created three large relief sculptures for the Katriina hospital in Vantaa, Finland. The ceramic reliefs decorated with recycled glass are each composed of more than ten separate pieces of different sizes. The works were done by commission for the Vantaa Art Museum.

International awards and honours 
In 1995, Johanna Rytkölä's ceramic sculpture ”On the way to paradise II” received the silver medal of the Presidency of the Republic in the 49th international ceramics competition “Premio Faenza” in Italy.

In 1997, Rytkölä's design for a plate received an Award of Merit in the Kutani International Decorative Ceramics Competition in Komatsu, Japan.

Memberships 
Johanna Rytkölä joined the Association of Finnish Sculptors in 1991 and the Finnish Association of Designers Ornamo in 1987. She has frequently served in an expert role in her field, for example as a member of the Finnish State Art Commission in 1996–1998 and in the steering group for the exhibition of contemporary Finnish ceramic art, “Ceramics & Space” in Helsinki in 2014.

Johanna Rytkölä has been a member of the International Academy of Ceramics (IAC-AIC) since 2007. In 2017 she represented Ornamo in the Finnish delegation promoting the Arctic Ceramic Centre in Lapland as the host for the IAC international congress in 2020.

Johanna Rytkölä is founding member in the art groups Artists O, Kuuma linja (Hotline) and Helsinki Fat Clay. Founded in 2006, Artists O seeks to act as a link between the designers’ association Ornamo and the Artists’ Association of Finland. The Hotline group, formed by six artists, promoted ceramic art around the turn of the millennium by organizing exhibitions in art museums across Finland. Helsinki Fat Clay was established in 2008 to promote Finnish ceramic art internationally. In 2012 the group was invited to present their works in the International Museum of Ceramics in Faenza, Italy.

References

External links 
 Johanna Rytkölä's website

1956 births
Living people
Finnish ceramists
Finnish women sculptors
20th-century Finnish sculptors
21st-century Finnish sculptors
20th-century Finnish women artists
21st-century Finnish women artists
21st-century ceramists
Finnish women ceramists